The Netherlands was represented by Teddy Scholten, with the song "Een beetje", at the 1959 Eurovision Song Contest, which took place on 11 March in Cannes, France. Song and singer were chosen independently of each other at the Dutch national final, held on 17 February. Scholten went on to win the 1959 contest for the Netherlands, the first time a country had scored two Eurovision victories. The 1957 contest winner Corry Brokken failed in her bid to represent the Netherlands for a fourth consecutive year, while future Dutch representative Greetje Kauffeld was also among those taking part.

Before Eurovision

Nationaal Songfestival 1959 
The national final took place at the AVRO TV studios in Hilversum, hosted by Karin Kraaykamp. Eight songs and seven singers were involved, with all songs presented twice by different performers, once with a full orchestra and once in a more pared-down style.

The winning song was chosen by votes from regional juries, then an "expert" jury decided which of the two performers and versions of the winning song should go to Cannes. After "Een beetje" was announced the winner, the expert jury chose Scholten with the full orchestra version of the song.

At Eurovision 
On the night of the final Scholten performed 5th in the running order, following Monaco and preceding Germany. At the close of voting "Een beetje" had received 21 points, winning the contest by a 5-point margin over runners-up the United Kingdom. The Netherlands thus became the first country to win Eurovision twice.

The Dutch conductor at the contest was Dolf van der Linden.

Rumours after the contest suggested that the Italian jury had awarded a very high 7 points to "Een beetje" in order to reduce the chances of a French or British win, but these were never substantiated.

Voting 
Every country had a jury of ten people. Every jury member could give one point to his or her favourite song.

External links 
 Dutch Preselection 1959

References 

1959
Countries in the Eurovision Song Contest 1959
Eurovision